The 2014 Arab Cup U-17 was the third edition of the Arab Cup U-17, an association football tournament between Arabic countries.  It was played from October to November 2014 and hosted by Qatar.

Participants 

 withdrew from the tournament.

Teams and Draw
The draw took place on 15 August 2014, in Doha Qatar.

The teams were drawn into the following groups:

{| class="wikitable" style="width:65%;"
|-
!width=25%|Group A
!width=25%|Group B
|-
|
 (host) 
 
  
|

Group stage

Group A

Group B

Knockout stage

Semi-finals

Third place playoff

Final

Winners

References

External links 
2014 Arab Cup U-17 - UAFA official website

Arab Cup U-17
Arab Cup U-17
Arab Cup U-17
2014